The 2013 Campeonato Internacional de Tenis de Santos was a professional tennis tournament played on clay courts. It was the third edition of the tournament which was part of the 2013 ATP Challenger Tour. It took place in Santos, Brazil between 15 and 21 April 2013.

Singles main draw entrants

Seeds

 1 Rankings are as of April 8, 2013.

Other entrants
The following players received wildcards into the singles main draw:
  Pablo Cuevas
  Ricardo Hocevar
  Caio Silva
  Júlio Silva

The following players received entry as a special exempt into the singles main draw:
  Steven Diez
  Jozef Kovalík

The following players received entry from the qualifying draw:
  Máximo González
  Rui Machado
  Stefano Travaglia
  Bastian Trinker

Doubles main draw entrants

Seeds

1 Rankings as of April 8, 2013.

Other entrants
The following pairs received wildcards into the doubles main draw:
  Rogério Dutra da Silva /  Eduardo Russi
  Allan Gomes Oliveira /  Caio Silva
  Wilson Leite /  João Souza

Champions

Singles

 Gastão Elias def.  Rogério Dutra da Silva, 4–6, 6–2, 6–0

Doubles

 Pavol Červenák /  Matteo Viola def.  Guilherme Clezar /  Gastão Elias, 6–2, 4–6, [10–6]

External links
Official Website

Campeonato Internacional de Tenis de Santos
Santos Brasil Tennis Open